Perfektan dan za banana ribe (trans. A Perfect Day for Bananafish) is the first and the only album by the Serbian rock band Talas. The album was printed in 3000 copies, and is available on LP only, since the album has not been reissued on CD.

Background 
Having released their two songs on the Artistička radna akcija compilation, the band started preparing their debut release. The album was recorded in the MS Studio in Belgrade and was produced by Bojan Pečar and Boban Petrović. Perfektan dan za banana ribe (which got the name by the J.D. Salinger's short-story A Perfect Day for Bananafish) was released in 1983 by Sarajevo Disk. The album featured eight song with the opening track, "Sama" ("Alone") became a nationwide hit and appeared on the Svetislav Prelić's Šećerna vodica movie soundtrack. As guests on the album appeared Milan "Mića" Bubalo (drum machine), Ivan Vdović Vd (drums), Milan Mladenović (guitar) and Vuk Vujačić (saxophone).

Track listing 
All music and lyrics written by Talas.

Personnel

The band 
 Bojan Pečar (vocals, bass, guitar, synthesizer, percussion)
 Mira Mijatović (vocals)

Additional musicians 
 Dušan Gerzić (saxophone, drums)
 Milan Bubalo (rhythm machine)
 Ivan Vdović Vd (drums, percussion)
 Milan Mladenović (guitar)
 Vuk Vujačić (saxophone)
 Boban Petrović (production, engineering)

External links 
 Perfektan dan za banana ribe at Discogs

1983 debut albums
VIA Talas albums
Sarajevo Disk albums